Rostanga risbeci, is a species of sea slug, a dorid nudibranch, a marine gastropod mollusc in the family Discodorididae.

Distribution
This species was described from Aitsu, Amakusa, Japan with additional specimens from Sagami Bay and the Echizen coast.Rudman, W.B., 2002 (February 4) Rostanga risbeci Baba, 1991. [In] Sea Slug Forum. Australian Museum, Sydney.

DescriptionRostanga risbeci is a purple-black or black dorid nudibranch with the dorsum covered with caryophyllidia; in general it is very similar in shape, but not in colour, to other species of Rostanga.

Ecology
This nudibranch is reported to feed on the black sponge Halichondria okadai - family Halichondriidae. Most species of Rostanga'' feed on sponges of the family Microcionidae.

References

Discodorididae
Gastropods described in 1991